Shimon or Simeon ben Hillel was the son of Hillel the Elder. Little is known about him. When Hillel died, Shimon may have took over his place as the Nasi of the Sanhedrin, as is implied by a passage in the Talmud.

Simeon was the father of Gamaliel I, and grandfather of Simeon ben Gamaliel, who may have been his namesake.

Some Christian writers identify him with the Simeon who blessed the infant Jesus.

References

Mishnah rabbis
1st-century deaths
1st-century rabbis
Year of birth unknown
Sanhedrin